Arab Sorang (also Romanized as ‘Arab Sorang) is a village in Aqabad Rural District, in the Central District of Gonbad-e Qabus County, Golestan Province, Iran. At the 2006 census, its population was 1,059, in 215 families.

References 

Populated places in Gonbad-e Kavus County